Illuminations are secular Autumn festivals of electric light held in several English cities, towns and villages, in particular:
Blackpool (1879–present)
Matlock Bath (1897–present)
Mousehole (1963–present)
Sunderland (actually Roker and Seaburn Illuminations; 1937–1959, 1986–1990s, 2012–present).

Blackpool Illuminations

Blackpool Illuminations run for 66 days each year. They switch on in late August with a star-studded 'Switch On' show and run to early November.

The 2006 Switch On was carried out by Dale Winton and the crowd were entertained by a host of acts including Peter Kay. David Tennant, a previous Doctor Who and past star of the Blackpool (television) television series, switched on the Lights in 2007. New for 2007 are a section outside the Tower called DecoDance, these were designed by Laurence Llewelyn-Bowen additionally new Doctor Who illuminations have been erected outside the Dr Who exhibition.

At six miles (9.65 kilometres) long and using over one million bulbs, the Blackpool Illuminations are an awesome spectacle. The Blackpool Illuminations consist of a wide variety of light displays: lasers, neon, light bulbs, fibre optics, searchlights and floodlighting. In 2006, there were more than 500 scenic designs and features. There are set pieces made out of wood studded with light bulbs; the characters and objects portrayed seem to “move” by way of winking lights. Three-dimensional illuminated scenes are also popular. There are over 500 road features attached to lamp posts linked together with festoon lighting. Strings of lights along the structure of buildings pick out landmarks in luminous detail – you can always make out the Blackpool Tower and the Pleasure Beach Blackpool rides in this way.

Morecambe Illuminations  
Morecambe's Illuminations once filled the promenade and gardens with a "spectacular wonderland of light" And in the resort's main park - Happy Mount Park. The lights ran from 1919 until 1996, famous faces such as Roger Moore and Noel Edmonds and even the towns most famous son and his companion, Morecambe and Wise were called upon to switch the Illuminations on for each season.

Although illuminations in there traditional way ended in 1996. Morecambe has continued to have Illumination activity.

In 2016, Shrimping.It and the Exchange in the west end completed a project of over 30 illuminated pictures, displayed in Alexandra park with local residents.

Callum Henry who had , set up an ambitious campaign of proposals in 2015 in which to bring back the illuminations. From the ups and downs, this brought the introduction of 'Luminate' began in late 2019, which would develop multiple light displays, re-imagined throughout the area. From community workshops as seen with January 2020's Expressions project over three nights along Morecambe's, coast, alongside new projects planned in an exciting programme of light festivities, bringing the illuminations back to the area. Luminate is now arguably Morecambes Modern Illuminations. As of 2021 there are further plans for to the illuminations to return to the promenade. Councillor Charlie Edwards has been working with Lancashire County Council and Morecambe BID to ensure funding for the event. In December 2021 new illuminations were installed along the promenade as part of a preliminary tatser of what the event could offer albeit on a much larger scale.

Past
Morecambe, 1919-1996
Walsall, 1951-2008 (primitive displays since 1875)

See also
West Country Carnival

References

External links
Blackpool Illuminations official website
 Teenagers Dream to bring back Morecambe Illuminations, Morecambe Visitor
 Illuminations Could "Bring Pride" Back to Morecambe, Morecambe Visitor
 Luminate Morecambe Website, Luminate

Festivals in Lancashire